Paulo César Rocha Rosa (born 5 January 1980), known as Paulo César, is a Brazilian former footballer who played as a forward.

He spent most of his professional career in Portugal, amassing Primeira Liga totals of 269 matches and 48 goals during 13 seasons, mainly with Braga and União de Leiria.

Football career
Paulo César was born in São Luís, Maranhão. After starting playing football with Vila Nova Futebol Clube he moved to Portugal still a youngster, and represented Gil Vicente FC, Vitória de Guimarães, Rio Ave F.C. and U.D. Leiria, making his Primeira Liga debut on 20 August 2000 against S.C. Campomaiorense; in 2003 he had a short return stint in Brazil, with Grêmio Esportivo Inhumense.

On 9 March 2008, Paulo César scored one for Leiria (eventually relegated) against S.L. Benfica at the Estádio da Luz, and the 2–2 final score meant the opposition coach José Antonio Camacho's dismissal. In July, after netting five goals in 29 games in his last season, he signed for S.C. Braga.

In his second campaign with the Minho club, Paulo César contributed prominently as it achieved a best-ever runner-up league position, notably scoring in home wins against Benfica (2–0) and Sporting CP (1–0), two of his five during the season.

Paulo César appeared in 40 official matches in 2010–11, including six in Braga's runner-up campaign in the UEFA Europa League. On 14 April 2011, he was sent off in the 30th minute of the quarter-finals second leg against FC Dynamo Kyiv for a dangerous challenge, but his team managed to progress to the next stage after securing a 0–0 home draw (1–1 on aggregate).

In January 2013, 33-year-old Paulo César left Braga and returned to his homeland, joining lowly Santa Cruz Futebol Clube.

Honours
Braga
Taça da Liga: 2012–13
UEFA Intertoto Cup: 2008
UEFA Europa League: Runner-up 2010–11

Santa Cruz
Campeonato Pernambucano: 2013

References

External links

1980 births
Living people
People from São Luís, Maranhão
Brazilian footballers
Association football forwards
Campeonato Brasileiro Série B players
Campeonato Brasileiro Série C players
Campeonato Brasileiro Série D players
Vila Nova Futebol Clube players
Santa Cruz Futebol Clube players
Associação Desportiva Recreativa e Cultural Icasa players
Maranhão Atlético Clube players
Primeira Liga players
Liga Portugal 2 players
Gil Vicente F.C. players
Vitória S.C. players
Rio Ave F.C. players
U.D. Leiria players
S.C. Braga players
S.C. Braga B players
Brazilian expatriate footballers
Expatriate footballers in Portugal
Brazilian expatriate sportspeople in Portugal
Sportspeople from Maranhão